is a passenger railway station  located in the town of Yazu, Yazu District, Tottori Prefecture, Japan. It is operated by the third sector company Wakasa Railway.

Lines
Only local trains stop at this station.

Station layout
The station consists of one ground-level side platform serving a single bi-directional track. The wooden station building is on the south side of the tracks. This station building and platform were built in 1929 and were registered as Tangible Cultural Property in 2008.

Adjacent stations

|-
!colspan=5|Wakasa Railway

History
Inabafunaoka Station opened on January 20, 1930.

Passenger statistics
In fiscal 2018, the station was used by an average of 35 passengers daily.

Surrounding area
Yazu Town Hall Funaoka Office
Yazu Town Funaoka Elementary School

See also
List of railway stations in Japan

References

External links 

Railway stations in Tottori Prefecture
Railway stations in Japan opened in 1930
Yazu, Tottori
Registered Tangible Cultural Properties